May We Have Peace is a 1992 bronze sculpture by Allan Houser, installed in Salt Lake City, Utah. The  statue depicts a Plains Indian man holding aloft a ceremonial pipe.

References

1992 sculptures
Bronze sculptures in Utah
Outdoor sculptures in Salt Lake City
Sculptures of men in Utah
Sculptures of Native Americans
Statues in Utah